The Dallas Grand Prix was a round of the Formula One World Championship in 1984. The race was cancelled in 1985 due to financial problems and safety concerns. The Dallas Grand Prix became a round of the American Trans-Am Series in 1988.

Originally the race was run at the Fair Park street circuit, before moving to nearby Addison in 1989. In 1993, the race relocated to a temporary street circuit around the Reunion Arena, at the time home to many of Dallas's sports teams.

Winners 
A pink background indicates an event which was not part of the Formula One World Championship.

References

See also
 List of Formula One Championship events
 United States Grand Prix
 Grand Prix of America

 
Formula One Grands Prix
Grand Prix
1984 establishments in Texas
Recurring sporting events established in 1984
Recurring sporting events disestablished in 1996